William Durland (born 1931) is a U.S. attorney, peace activist, author, educator and former member of the Virginia State Legislature.
He is married to Eugenia Smith Durland and they have one son. He also has three children from a former marriage. He is a member of the Religious Society of Friends (Quakers). He graduated from Scarsdale High School in 1949 and after college graduation he joined the National Security Agency as an intelligence analyst. He served in the U.S. Army Medical Service Corps from 1954 to 1957 overseas, and was a Captain in U.S. Army JAG Reserve from 1966 to 1968.

Education 

He received a Bachelor's degree from Bucknell University in 1953, and a JD degree from Georgetown Law School in 1959. In 1975 he earned an M.A. in Biblical Theology and Nonviolence from Notre Dame University and in 1977 he received a PhD. from Union Graduate School at Antioch College in Political and Religious Philosophy.

Political life 

William Durland served in the Virginia House of Delegates as a Democrat representing the 27th District (which at the time represented the County of Fairfax and the cities of Fairfax, Virginia and Falls Church, Virginia) from 1966–1969)

Durland was later elected as the Vice-Mayor and Council member of the Town of Cokedale, Colorado in 1990, and was elected as a member of the City Council of the city of Trinidad, Colorado in 1995.

Professional life 

William Durland has practiced in the areas of international, constitutional and human right laws for 58 years. He argued before the Supreme Court of the United States in the case of Goldfarb v. Virginia State Bar, .

Durland also has had a long history in education, teaching in the areas of Philosophy, History and Government, at Purdue University, Villanova University, the University of Notre Dame, and in the Colorado Community College System. He also taught peace and justice courses at Pendle Hill Quaker Study and Contemplation Center from 1985-1988.

Books authored 

William Durland has written several books on theology and Nonviolence including God or Nations Radial Theology for the Religious Peace Movement (1989), No King but Caesar (1975), People pay for peace: A military tax refusal guide for radical religious pacifists and people of conscience (1980), Ethical Issues. A Search for the Contemporary Conscience (1975), The apocalyptic witness: A radical calling for our own times (1988), and The illegality of war (1983).

Durland is also the author of more than 10 plays.

Peace activism 
Durland became a peace and justice activist in 1958, while studying law. He is the founder of the Community for Creative Nonviolence (1970, D.C.), The Matthew 25 Free Health Clinic and Nonviolence Center (1976, Ft. Wayne, Ind.), The National Center on Law and Pacifism (1978, Philadelphia), The Center on Law and Human Rights (2003, Colorado Springs, CO). He has held numerous positions in the Democratic Party from 1958 to 2023.
In 2002, Bill and his wife Genie traveled to Palestine and Iraq as part of  delegations from Christian Peacemaker Teams.

In 2005, Durland defended Dale Bartell before a court-martial at Fort Carson.

In 2008 Durland served on the defense teams of Robin Long and Daniel Sandate the first two U.S. soldiers deported from Canada, after having fled to Canada to avoid fighting in the Iraq War.

References

Living people
Writers from Colorado Springs, Colorado
Members of the Virginia House of Delegates
1931 births
Virginia lawyers
Colorado city council members
Bucknell University alumni
Antioch College alumni
Georgetown University Law Center alumni
American Quakers
American tax resisters